Silvia Arderius Martín (born 11 July 1990) is a Spanish handballer for CBF Málaga Costa del Sol and the Spanish national team.

Achievements

Club
Super Amara Bera Bera
Spanish División de Honor Femenina:
Winner: 2017–18
 Copa de la Reina de Balonmano:
 Runner-up: 2017–18

National team
Women's World University Handball Championship:
 Winner: 2016

Awards and recognition
Trofeo Vicen Muñoz:
Winner: 2013/14, 2016/17
Spanish División de Honor Femenina:
Best centre back: 2016/17
Top Scorer: 2016/17
MVP: 2017/18

References

External links

Living people
1990 births
Spanish female handball players
Sportspeople from Madrid
Handball players from the Community of Madrid
21st-century Spanish women